Springfield Township is a township in Montgomery County, Pennsylvania. The population was 20,814 at the 2020 census. It includes the villages of Wyndmoor, Erdenheim, Flourtown, and Oreland.  The communities of Lafayette Hill, Fort Washington, Laverock, North Hills, Miquon, and Glenside are also situated partly inside the Township.

History

The Black Horse Inn, Carson College for Orphan Girls, Springfield Mill, and Yeakle and Miller Houses are listed on the National Register of Historic Places.

Geography
According to the U.S. Census Bureau, the township has a total area of 6.8 square miles (17.6 km2), of which 6.8 square miles (17.6 km2)  is land and 0.15% is water.

The township is bordered in Montgomery County by (clockwise from west) Whitemarsh Township to the west, Upper Dublin Township to the north, shares a corner with Abington Township to the northeast, and Cheltenham Township to the east. In Philadelphia, it is adjacent to Cedarbrook to the southeast (along Ivy Hill Rd.), shares a corner with East Mount Airy to the south (Stenton and Ivy Hill), and Chestnut Hill to the southwest (along Stenton Ave.)

Transportation

The main highways serving Springfield Township are Pennsylvania Route 73 and Pennsylvania Route 309. PA 73 follows Church Road along a southeast-northwest alignment through the middle of the township. PA 309 follows the Fort Washington Expressway along a similar alignment, though they do intersect at an interchange near the northern edge of the township.

SEPTA Regional Rail's Lansdale/Doylestown Line passes through the northern edge of Springfield Township, with the Oreland station located within the township and the North Hills station located just outside the township in Abington Township.

Demographics

As of 2021 there were 20,590 people in the township.  The population density was 3,060 people per square mile.  There were 7,982 housing units.  The racial makeup of the township was 81% White, 9% African American, 2% Asian, and 3% from two or more races. Hispanic or Latino of any race were 4%. The foreign born population was 5.5%, with 8.5% of households speaking a language other than English at home.

There were 7,760 households, 68% were married couples living together, 11% had a female householder with no husband present, 4% a male householder with no wife present, and 16% were non-families. The average household size was 2.52. Of the 7,982 housing units, 79% were owner-occupied and 21% rented. Single units account for 82% of all housing, multi-units 18%, and there were no mobile homes.

Springfield's median age was 44.9. The age distribution was 21.4% under the age of 18, 4.7% from 18 to 24, 25.8% from 25 to 44, 24.8% from 45 to 64, and 23.3% 65 or older.  The median age was 44 under the age of 18, 57% 18-64, and 21% 65 and over.

The median household income was $109,025 and the per capita income for the township was $57,230.  Twenty percent of household made more than $200,000 per year. The overall poverty rate was 3.9%, with 2% of children under 18 living in poverty and 9% of those 65 or over.

Education
Springfield Township School District serves the township.  It operates Springfield Township High School, Springfield Township Middle School, Enfield Elementary School, and Erdenheim Elementary School.  Four Catholic schools are located in the township: Mount Saint Joseph Academy (girls' high school), Martin Saints Classical High School, La Salle College High School (boys' high school) and St. Genevieve's School (K-8).  The township is also served by the Free Library of Springfield Township.

Politics and government

Springfield Township has a township-manager form of government and is governed by a seven-member Board of Commissioners who are elected for four year terms. The commissioners are elected in odd-numbered years, with half being elected every two years. Odd-numbered districts are elected in one election cycle (i.e. 2023), and even-numbered districts in the next (i.e. 2025). The township is divided into seven wards, each with one commissioner. All wards have two precincts with the exception of Ward 2, which has three.

The Springfield Township School District's boundaries are coterminous with the township's. The school district is composed of nine elected members, each elected for four years. 

The township is part of State House District 154 (represented by Rep. Napoleon Nelson) and State Senate District 4 (represented by Art Haywood).

The township is covered by  the 4th congressional district (represented by Rep. Madeleine Dean).

Notable residents

 Jim Cramer (born 1955), CNBC host of Mad Money

See also
Erdenheim Farm
Whitemarsh Hall

References

External links

Springfield Township official site

Townships in Montgomery County, Pennsylvania